BC Alytus is the historical basketball club of Alytus, Lithuania. It was founded in 2005, as a successor to BC Alita, and participated in the Lietuvos Krepšinio Lyga (Lithuanian Basketball League) and the Baltic Basketball League for a few seasons. In 2011 BC Alytus went to bankruptcy, and another basketball club, called BC Savanoris, later becoming BC Dzūkija, was established in Alytus.

Achievements

Notable players

  Saulius Kazevičius
  Nerijus Varnelis
  Andrius Aleksandrovas
  Mindaugas Jaruševičius
  Žygimantas Janavičius
  Tadas Klimavičius
  Darjuš Lavrinovič
  Kšyštof Lavrinovič

References

External links 
Official website of Alytus
 BC Alytus LKL.lt

Basketball teams in Lithuania
Sport in Alytus
2005 establishments in Lithuania